Hesper is an unincorporated community in Douglas County, Kansas, United States.  It is located two and a half miles southeast of Eudora.

History
Hesper was founded in 1858 by Quakers wanting to lend support to the free-state cause.  In 1884, the Hesper Academy was opened but it closed in 1912.

A post office was opened in Hesper in 1868, and remained in operation until it was discontinued in 1900.

Education
The community is served by Eudora USD 491 public school district.

Notable people
Friends University in Wichita was founded by James Davis, who was a native of Hesper. The town is also the birthplace of the college football player and coach John H. Outland, namesake of the Outland Trophy. Walter R. Stubbs, Governor of Kansas from 1909-1913 grew up in the Hesper area.

References

Further reading

External links
 Douglas County maps: Current, Historic, KDOT

Unincorporated communities in Douglas County, Kansas
Unincorporated communities in Kansas
Populated places established in 1858
1858 establishments in Kansas Territory